Yukiko Shinozaki is a Japanese dancer and choreographer working from Brussels, Belgium.

Education
Yukiko Shinozaki studied classical ballet in Tokyo, and modern dance at Portland State University (Oregon), where she also obtained a  B.A. In psychology. In 1992 she moved to New York, where she worked as a freelance dancer and showed her own solo work.

Collaboration with Meg Stuart / Damaged Goods
In 1997, Yukiko Shinozaki came to Belgium to work for Damaged Goods (Brussels), the dance company of the American choreographer Meg Stuart. She was a dancer in Splayed Mind Out (Meg Stuart / Damaged Goods and Gary Hill, 1997), Appetite (Meg Stuart / Damaged Goods and Ann Hamilton, 1998), Sand Table (Meg Stuart / Damaged Goods and Magali Desbazeille, 2000) and Highway 101 (Meg Stuart / Damaged Goods, 2000), and the assistant choreographer on Remote (Meg Stuart / Damaged Goods, 1997).

Own artistic work
Since 2000, Yukiko Shinozaki focuses on her own productions. She often does this in collaboration with  Heine Avdal, another former member of Damaged Goods. She regards artistic collaborations, with both Heine Avdal and others, as an important factor in her work. The confrontation and encounter with different performers and situations delivers elements that integrate into her work, which focuses on the inner complexity and contradiction of the body. An important part of her movement language is the transformation process. Familiar actions gradually transform through subtle shifts and manipulations into an unusual world. Her most frequently performed productions are nothing's for something (Heine Avdal and Yukiko Shinozaki, 2012), Field Works-office (Heine Avdal and Yukiko Shinozaki, 2010), Field Works-hotel (Heine Avdal and Yukiko Shinozaki, 2009), you are here (Heine Avdal and Yukiko Shinozaki, 2008) and Inner Horizon (co-creation with Christelle Fillod, 2005). Yukiko Shinozaki also assisted Heine Avdal on his productions terminal (2001), Box with holes (2004), IN_LINE (2005) and Some notes are (2006).

fieldworks
Originally, Yukiko Shinozaki created her own artistic work under the wings of deepblue, a production structure she shared with Heine Avdal and sound artist Christoph De Boeck. Since 2012, she does this under the wings of fieldworks vzw (Brussels), an organization that focuses on the creation, production, distribution and promotion of Yukiko Shinozaki and Heine Avdal's work. Their extensive range of productions already toured in a wide range of countries in Europe and Asia, but also in the United States, Cuba and Lebanon.

Productions
With fieldworks:
 Cast off Skin (Yukiko Shinozaki and Heine Avdal, 2000)
 Closer (Yukiko Shinozaki and Heine Avdal, 2003)
 Breaking through the roof of its house (Yukiko Shinozaki and Christelle Fillod, 2005)
 Inner horizon (co-creation with Christelle Fillod, 2005)
 hibi (2007, Yukiko Shinozaki and Un Yamada)
 you are here (Yukiko Shinozaki and Heine Avdal, 2008)
 Field Works-hotel (Yukiko Shinozaki and Heine Avdal, 2009)
 Field Works-office (Yukiko Shinozaki and Heine Avdal, 2010)
 installation you are here (Yukiko Shinozaki and Heine Avdal, 2010)
 Borrowed Landscape (Yukiko Shinozaki and Heine Avdal, 2011)
 nothing's for something (Yukiko Shinozaki and Heine Avdal, 2012)
 The seventh floor of the world (Yukiko Shinozaki, Heine Avdal and Sachiyo Takahashi, 2013)
 distant voices (Yukiko Shinozaki and Heine Avdal, 2014)
 as if nothing has been spinning around for something to remember (Yukiko Shinozaki and Heine Avdal, 2014)
 carry on (Yukiko Shinozaki and Heine Avdal, 2015)
 THE OTHEROOM (Yukiko Shinozaki, Heine Avdal and Rolf Wallin, 2016)
 unannounced (Yukiko Shinozaki and Heine Avdal, 2017)

With Meg Stuart / Damaged Goods:
 Splayed Mind Out (Meg Stuart / Damaged Goods and Gary Hill, 1997)
 Remote (Meg Stuart / Damaged Goods, 1997)
 appetite (Meg Stuart / Damaged Goods and Ann Hamilton, 1998)
 sand table (Meg Stuart / Damaged Goods and Magali Desbazeille, 2000)
 Highway 101 (Meg Stuart / Damaged Goods, 2000)

References

Sources
 Kunstenpunt - Persons - Yukiko Shinozaki according to Kunstenpunt
 Biography of Yukiko Shinozaki on the website of fieldworks

Further reading
 Christoph De Boeck, Een genetisch rapport: De genesis van Closer, in: Etcetera, 2004-02, Volume 22, Issue 90, p. 44
 Rudi Laermans, Het onzichtbare podiumlichaam, in: Etcetera, 2001-06, Volume 19, Issue 77, p. 56-58
 Rudi Laermans, Het kunstwerk als performatief netwerk, in: Etcetera, 2007-06, Volume 25, Issue 107, p. 64-67
 Jeroen Peeters, Toedekken en afpellen, in: Financieel-Economische Tijd, 07/02/2001

 Jeroen Peeters, Het transparante lichaam voorbij: ‘Closer’ van Deep Blue beleeft première in Vooruit, in: De Morgen, 12/03/2004
 Pieter T'Jonck, Dansende datastromen, in: De Tijd, 08/10/2003

Japanese choreographers
Contemporary dancers
Contemporary dance choreographers